Weaste is a inner-city suburb of Salford, Greater Manchester, England. In 2014, Weaste and Seedley ward had a population of 12,616.

History 
Historically in Lancashire, it is an industrial area, with many industrial estates. The A57 (Eccles New Road) passes through Weaste, which lies close to the M602 motorway. Weaste is north of Salford Quays.

The name is from Old French waste meaning "common land, waste".

Textiles and the Industrial Revolution 
19th century cotton firm Ermen & Engels—part-owned by the father of Friedrich Engels—established its second factory in 1837 near Weaste Station, on the Liverpool and Manchester Railway line. Friedrich worked for the factory in its offices near the Royal Exchange in Manchester.

Governance 
The electoral ward of Weaste and Seedley is represented in Westminster by Rebecca Long-Bailey, MP for Salford and Eccles.

The ward is represented on Salford City Council by three Labour councillors: Philip Cusack, Alexis Shama, and Madeline Wade.

Landmarks 
St Luke's Church is a grade II* listed building designed by George Gilbert Scott where Emily Pankhurst, the women's suffragette leader, was married.

Between 1901 and 2011, Salford Rugby League club played their homes games at the Willows off Weaste Lane. In 2012, the club moved to the AJ Bell Stadium in Barton-upon-Irwell.

Weaste Cemetery is one of Salford's large municipal cemeteries.

Transport links
Trams:
Weaste Metrolink station is on the Eccles line, with trams to Eccles, MediaCityUK, Manchester, Etihad Campus and Ashton-Under-Lyne.

Buses:
27 to Swinton and Manchester, the 33 to Worsley and Manchester, the 63 to Brookhouse and Manchester, 110 to the Trafford Centre and Manchester and the 41 to Eccles and Sale serve Weaste, and are operated by First Greater Manchester; 10/M10 to Brookhouse and Manchester serves Weaste, and is operated by Arriva North West.

Notable residents 
Sir Peter Maxwell Davies, the conductor and composer, originated from Weaste.

Born and brought up in Salford, Terry Eagleton and Tony Wilson attended De La Salle Grammar School on the junction of Weaste Lane and Eccles Old Road. De La Salle Grammar School was demolished in April 2015.

Musical conductor Sir Charles Hallé, 19th century lifesaver Mark Addy, Manchester United Busby Babe Eddie Colman, who died in the Munich air disaster and Ferdinand Stanley, who rode in the Charge of the Light Brigade, are all buried in Weaste Cemetery.

See also
Listed buildings in Salford, Greater Manchester

References

External links
 Weaste tram stop on the Metrolink website
 St Luke's church

Areas of Salford
Geography of Salford
Industrial parks in the United Kingdom